Minna Keal, née Mina Nerenstein (22 March 1909 – 14 November 1999) was a British composer. After early compositions as a student, she only returned to composing at the end of her life. Aged 80 when her music was first performed at the Proms in 1989, she experienced her return to composition as a new life:

Life
Mina Nerenstein was born in the East End of London, the daughter of Russian-Jewish immigrants from Belarus who ran a Hebrew bookselling business in Petticoat Lane. Her father died in 1926. In 1928 she entered the Royal Academy of Music, studying composition with William Alwyn. Student compositions included chamber works performed at the Academy, Whitechapel Gallery and Alexandra Palace.

According to her obituary, she had a promising start to a musical career. Among her student works which have survived are a Fantasie in C minor for violin and piano, a Ballade in F minor for viola and piano (first performed in 1929 by Philip Burton of the Griller Quartet) and Three Summer Sketches for piano. These early works are particularly passionate and full of rich harmonies and vibrant melodies.

In 1929, aged 20, she was forced to give up her musical study to help her mother in the family business. She married Barnett Samuel, a solicitor, had a son, Raphael (later a well-known Marxist historian), and gave up composing. During the 1930s she was active in left-wing politics, and joined the British Communist Party in 1939. When the Anschluss occurred, she began working with local citizenry to help evacuate Jewish children who were being transported to Britain from Nazi occupied territories. On the break-up of her first marriage during World War II Mina worked in an aircraft factory near Slough. There, she met Bill Keal, and they eventually married in 1959.

In 1975 the composer Justin Connolly, having stumbled across some of Keal's youthful music archived at the Royal Academy of Music, encouraged her to start composing again, and she took composition lessons with him. Her String Quartet, Op. 1, was completed in 1978 and first performed in 1989. The Wind Quintet, Op. 2, followed in 1980. After taking lessons with Oliver Knussen in 1982, she completed her four-movement Symphony, Op. 3, which was performed as a BBC broadcast in 1988 and at the BBC Proms in 1989. Cantillation for violin and orchestra, Op. 4, was completed in 1988 and first performed in 1991. Between 1988 and 1994 she worked on the Cello Concerto, Op. 5, which was subsequently recorded by Alexander Baillie and the BBC Scottish Symphony Orchestra under Martyn Brabbins for the NMC label. On the same record is her Ballade (1929) for cello and piano, in which Alexander Baillie is accompanied by pianist Martina Baillie.

In 1999, "the Royal Academy of Music honoured its former pupil with a 90th birthday concert packed with friends and colleagues celebrating the composer who proved that you're never too old to make an impact." She died on 14 November 1999.

References

External links
MusicWeb biography

1909 births
1999 deaths
British classical composers
English people of Belarusian-Jewish descent
English people of Russian-Jewish descent
Women classical composers
Jewish English musicians
20th-century classical composers
British communists
Musicians from London
Alumni of the Royal Academy of Music
20th-century English musicians
20th-century English women musicians
20th-century British composers
20th-century women composers